"Everything" is the eighth single by American rock band Buckcherry, and third from their third album, 15. The song is about a relationship that isn't working out as well as the two partners would want it to be, and they say if they had "everything", their drug problems may be solved. The song has received many plays on radio stations across Canada and the United States.

Chart performance
"Everything" was a moderate chart success, reaching No. 6 on Mainstream Rock Tracks, No. 23 on Modern Rock Tracks, No. 17 on Bubbling Under Hot 100, and No. 50 on Canadian Hot 100.

Charts

References

Buckcherry songs
2007 singles
Songs written by Josh Todd
Songs written by Keith Nelson (musician)
2005 songs
Eleven Seven Label Group singles